The dusky-blue flycatcher (Muscicapa comitata) is a species of bird in the family Muscicapidae.
It has a wide range of presence across the African tropical rainforest.
Its natural habitat is subtropical or tropical moist lowland forests.

References

dusky-blue flycatcher
Birds of the African tropical rainforest
dusky-blue flycatcher
Taxonomy articles created by Polbot
Taxobox binomials not recognized by IUCN